Meisch is a surname. Notable people with the surname include:

Claude Meisch (born 1971), Luxembourgish politician
Dietmar Meisch (born 1959), East German race walker

See also
Meisch House